Elton Vata (born 13 April 1998) is an Albanian footballer who plays for Erzeni Shijak as a goalkeeper.

Club career

KF Laçi
In September 2016, Vata joined Albanian Superliga club KF Laçi. He made his league debut for the club on 26 November 2016 in a 1-0 away loss to Skënderbeu Korçë. He played all ninety minutes of the match.

References

External links

 Profile - FSHF

1998 births
Living people
People from Kukës
Association football goalkeepers
Albanian footballers
KF Laçi players
KF Erzeni players
Kategoria Superiore players
Kategoria e Parë players